The Journal of Behavioral and Experimental Economics is a bimonthly peer-reviewed academic journal covering behavioral and experimental economics. It was established in 1972 as the Journal of Behavioral Economics, and was renamed the Journal of Socio-Economics in 1991. It obtained its current name in 2014. The editor-in-chief is Pablo Branas-Garza. In 2013-2021 its Editor was Ofer Azar (Ben-Gurion University of the Negev). According to the Journal Citation Reports, the journal has a 2021 impact factor of 1.831.

References

External links

Economics journals
Socioeconomics
Behavioral economics
Publications established in 1972
Elsevier academic journals
Bimonthly journals
English-language journals